Romeno (Romén in local dialect) is a comune (municipality) in Trentino in the northern Italian region Trentino-Alto Adige/Südtirol, located about  north of Trento.

Geography

Romeno borders the following municipalities: Amblar, Cavareno, Coredo, Dambel, Don, Sanzeno and Sarnonico.

Frazioni
The municipality of Romeno contains the frazioni (subdivisions, mainly villages and hamlets) Malgolo and Salter.

Demographic evolution

References

External links
 Homepage of the city

Cities and towns in Trentino-Alto Adige/Südtirol